Belhelvie is a small village and civil parish in Aberdeenshire in Scotland.  The parish has a population of 3,802, of which 1,653 are in the village.  The history of the parish is available online. The churchyard contains a notable example of a morthouse used against the activities of bodysnatchers in the early 19th century.

Notable people
David Lindsay, minister of Belhelvie and prominent Covenanter (d. 1667)
General Sir Peter Lumsden, born at Belhelvie Lodge, 1829
General Sir Harry Lumsden
Reverend Alexander John Forsyth, Inventor of the Percussion cap.
George Stott (1835-1889), Christian missionary with the China Inland Mission
Sir Frederick Stewart, FRS (1916-2001), studied local geology.
Steve Murdoch, Professor of Scottish history at the University of St Andrews and co-author of Belhelvie: A Millennium of History (Belhelvie Community Council, 2001).

References

External links

 Belhelvie - a Covenanting heartland?
 Belhelvie community site
 Belhelvie church and cemetery 2018 archive
 Belhelvie at Knowhere

Villages in Aberdeenshire